Charles Gaines (born 1944) is an American artist whose work interrogates the discourse of aesthetics, politics, and philosophy.  Taking the form of drawings, photographic series and video installations, the work consistently involves the use of systems, predominantly in the form of the grid, often in combination with photography.  His work is rooted in Conceptual Art – in dialogue with artists such as Sol LeWitt, Lawrence Weiner and Mel Bochner – and Gaines is committed to its tenets of engaging cognition and language. As one of the only African-American conceptual artists working in the 1970s, a time when political expressionism was a prevailing concern among African-American artists, Gaines was an outlier in his pursuit of abstraction and non-didactic approach to race and politics. There is a strong musical thread running through much of Gaines' work, evident in his repeated use of musical scores as well in his engagement with the idea of indeterminacy, as similar to John Cage and Sol LeWitt.

Early life and education
Gaines was born in Charleston, South Carolina. Raised in Newark, New Jersey, he attended Newark Arts High School and received a BA from Jersey City State College in 1966. He earned his MFA in 1967 as the first African American to be accepted into the MFA program at the School of Art and Design at the Rochester Institute of Technology. From 1967 to 1990 he was a professor of art at California State University Fresno. Since 1989, he has been a faculty member at the California Institute of the Arts, influencing many young artists who studied with him, among them Edgar Arceneaux, Sadie Barnette, Andrea Bowers, Mark Bradford, Sam Durant, Rodney McMillian, and Laura Owens. In 2008 Gaines taught at the Skowhegan School of Painting and Sculpture. He currently lives and works in Los Angeles, California.

Career 
In Motion: Trisha Brown Dance (1981), Gaines photographed postmodern dancer Trisha Brown performing the piece Son of Gone Fishin'''. Numbering the spaces in a grid that correspond with the body in motion, and overlaying another grid drawing for each image in the series, Gaines seeks to transcribe the moving body in a way that the photograph cannot. In doing so, he also creates an erasure of the body's distinguishing contours – aligning with Trisha Brown's embrace of structures that obscure themselves. With the series Walnut Tree Orchard, Charles Gaines started working with photographs in his artworks in addition to mathematical formulas, continuing the use of grid paper.ExplosionsHistory of StarsNIGHT/CRIMESShadowsWalnut Tree Orchard (1975-2014)String TheoryManifestosSound Text (2015)

In addition to working on his art, Gaines has been serving on the advisory board of the Hauser & Wirth Institute since 2018.

Exhibitions
After his first New York City exhibition at Cinque Gallery in 1972, Charles Gaines was included in the 1975 Whitney Biennial at the Whitney Museum of American Art in New York City. In the 1980s, Charles Gaines was represented by and had solo exhibitions at Leo Castelli Gallery and John Weber Gallery in New York. He has shown at Margo Leavin Gallery in Los Angeles, Young Hoffman in Chicago, Richard Heller Gallery in San Francisco, and Galerie Lavignes-Bastille in Paris, among others. In 2006 Gaines began to exhibit with Susanne Vielmetter Los Angeles Projects, and in 2014 with Paula Cooper Gallery, New York.

Most recently, he was included in 56th Venice Biennale, curated by Okwui Enwezor in 2015. His work has been included in other major group exhibitions, including the 2007 Venice Biennale, "Blues for Smoke" (Museum of Contemporary Art, Los Angeles, 2012) and Now Dig This! Art and Black Los Angeles 1960 – 1980, curated by Kellie Jones at the Hammer Museum and Under the Big Black Sun: 1974–1981, at the Museum of Contemporary Art, Los Angeles which was curated by Paul Schimmel as part of the 2011 Getty's Pacific Standard Time initiative, Gaines was featured in two prominent Los Angeles exhibitions:

In 2012 the Pomona College Museum of Art and the Pitzer Art Gallery in Claremont, CA, exhibited In The Shadow of Numbers, Charles Gaines Selected Works from 1975 to 2012 which involved a collaborative musical performance with Terry Adkins.  Charles Gaines: Gridwork 1974–1999, the artist's first survey exhibition, was organized by The Studio Museum in Harlem in July 2014.

In 2019 the SculptureCenter, Queens, New York, exhibited Searching the Sky for Rain from September 16, 2019 – December 16, 2019 which is a collaboration of many artist such as Carmen Argote, Tony Cokes, Rafael Domenech, Mandy El-Sayegh, ektor garcia, Jacqueline Kiyomi Gordon, Tishan Hsu, Rindon Johnson, Becket MWN, Shahryar Nashat, Michael Queenland, Johanna Unzueta, Jala Wahid, Eric Wesley, Riet Wijnen  and Charles Gaines included. The Searching the Sky for Rain exhibit has only two of his works within them. The one placed in the ground floor was the “Numbers and Trees: Central Park Series II: Tree #7" (made in 2016) Laurel and the second placed in the lower level being "Face 1: Identity Politics, #10, Edward Said" (made in 2018).

Awards
Gaines received a National Endowment for the Arts (NEA) Grant in 1977.  He received a California Community Foundation (CCF) in 2011, and a Guggenheim Fellowship in 2013.  Gaines received the CalArts REDCAT Award in 2018 and was awarded the 60th annual Edward MacDowell Medal in 2019.

Writing
Gaines has written a number of academic texts including: Theater of Refusal: Black Art and Mainstream Criticism (UC Irvine, 1993); Art, Post History and the Paradox of Black Pluralism, Merge, 12 (2004); "Reconsidering Metaphor/Metonymy: Art and the Suppression of Thought", Art Lies, Issue 64 (Winter/2009); "Ben Patterson: The History of Gray Matter From the Avant-garde to the Postmodern", a catalog essay for an exhibition at the Contemporary Arts Museum Houston (November 2010); and Kerry James Marshall, London: Phaidon Press, 2017.

Solo exhibitions
2022 

Gridwork: Palm Canyon Watercolors Galerie Max Hetzler, Paris

2021

New Work: Charles Gaines
San Francisco Museum of Modern Art, San Francisco 

Dia Beacon, Beacon

Multiples of Nature, Trees and Faces Hauser & Wirth, London

2022

Drawings, Hauser & Wirth, St. Moritz

2019

Palm Trees and Other Works, Hauser & Wirth, Los Angeles

2018

Galerie Max Hetzler, Berlin

Faces 1: Identity Politics, Paula Cooper Gallery, New York

Group Exhibitions
2022

Forest Through the Trees, Laumeier Sculpture Park, St. Louis

Lifes, Hammer Museum, Los Angeles (catalogue)

2021

Grief and Grievance: Art and Mourning in America, New Museum, New York (catalogue)

Kathmandu Triennial, Kathmandu

Blood, Sweat, and Tears, UMLAUF Sculpture Garden and Museum, Austin

Lives that Bind: a restorative justice installation, Santa Monica City Hall East, Santa Monica

2020

Lives that Bind: a restorative justice installation
City Services Building Art Bank, Santa Monica

Drawing 2020
Gladstone Gallery, New York

To Form a More Perfect Union
Hauser & Wirth, New York

Artists for New York
Hauser & Wirth, New York

Garden of Six Seasons
Para Site, Hong Kong

2019

Words, Alexander Berggruen, New York

Generations: A History of Black Abstract Art, The Baltimore Museum of Art, Baltimore

Searching the Sky for Rain, SculptureCenter, New York

Process and Pattern, Wisch Family Gallery, Anderson Collection at Stanford University, Stanford

Trees, Fondation Cartier pour l´art contemporain, Paris

The World to Come: Art in the Age of the Anthropocene, University of Michigan Museum of Art, Ann Arbor

About Things Loved: Blackness and Belonging, Berkeley Art Museum and Pacific Film Archive, Berkeley

California Artists in the Marciano Collection, Marciano Art Foundation, Los Angeles

Mapping Black Identities, Minneapolis Institute of Art, Minneapolis

Solidary & Solitary: The Joyner / Giuffrida Collection, Smart Museum of Art, Chicago

Selected Public Collections

Art Institute of Chicago, Chicago

Blanton Museum of Art, The University of Texas at Austin, Austin, Texas 

Baltimore Museum of Art, Baltimore

Hammer Museum, Los Angeles, California

Hirshhorn Museum and Sculpture Garden, Washington DC

Lentos Museum, Linz

Marciano Collection, Los Angeles

Museum of Contemporary Art, Chicago

Minneapolis Institute of Art, Minneapolis, MN ("Explosion #25", 2008)

Art market
Gaines is represented by Hauser & Wirth (since 2018) and Galerie Max Hetzler. He previously worked with Paula Cooper Gallery and Vielmetter Los Angeles.

 References 

External links
 Miranda, Carolina A., "How the dense grids of artist Charles Gaines took the ego out of art", Los Angeles Times'', March 3, 2015.

1944 births
Living people
African-American artists
California Institute of the Arts faculty
Artists from Charleston, South Carolina
Artists from Newark, New Jersey
Newark Arts High School alumni
Rochester Institute of Technology alumni
21st-century African-American people
20th-century African-American people